The 1993 NCAA Division I-AA Football Championship Game was a postseason college football game between the Youngstown State Penguins and the Marshall Thundering Herd. The game was played on December 18, 1993, at Marshall University Stadium in Huntington, West Virginia. The culminating game of the 1993 NCAA Division I-AA football season, it was won by Youngstown State, 17–5.  This was the third consecutive season that these two teams met in the championship game.

Teams
The participants of the Championship Game were the finalists of the 1993 I-AA Playoffs, which began with a 16-team bracket. The site of the title game, Marshall University Stadium, had been predetermined months earlier.

Youngstown State Penguins

Youngstown State finished their regular season with a 9–2 record. Unseeded in the tournament, the Penguins defeated UCF, top-seed Georgia Southern, and Idaho to reach the final. This was the third appearance, both consecutively and overall, for Youngstown State in a Division I-AA championship game, having won in 1991 and having lost in 1992.

Marshall Thundering Herd

Marshall finished their regular season with an 8–3 record (5–2 in conference). Also unseeded, the Thundering Herd defeated Howard, Delaware, and Troy State to reach the final. This was the fourth appearance overall, and third consecutively, for Marshall in a Division I-AA championship game, having won in 1992 and having lost in 1987 and 1991.

Game summary
The only touchdowns in the game came during Youngstown State's first three plays from scrimmage. After Marshall's game opening kickoff went out of bounds, Youngstown State scored from their own 35-yard-line on two running plays. At the end of Marshall's ensuing possession, the Herd's punter was tackled inside their own 10-yard-line, and Youngstown State scored their second rushing touchdown on the next play. The only scoring throughout the remainder of the game was a field goal by each team, and Youngstown State gave up a safety late in the fourth quarter.

Scoring summary

Game statistics

References

Further reading

External links
 1-AA National Championship 1993 Youngstown State via YouTube: Part 1, Part 2, Part 3, Part 4, Part 5, Part 6 missing, Part 7, Part 8

Championship Game
NCAA Division I Football Championship Games
Marshall Thundering Herd football games
Youngstown State Penguins football games
Sports competitions in West Virginia
NCAA Division I-AA Football Championship Game
NCAA Division I-AA Football Championship Game